Gobabis railway station is a railway station serving the town of Gobabis in Namibia. It is part of the TransNamib Railway that connects the town with the Namibian capital of Windhoek.

Gallery 

Railway stations in Namibia
TransNamib Railway
Gobabis
Buildings and structures in Omaheke Region